Elaphidion pseudonomon is a species of beetle in the family Cerambycidae. It was described by Ivie in 1985.

References

pseudonomon
Beetles described in 1985